Brunots Island Race Track was a one-mile dirt oval on Brunot Island in Pittsburgh, Pennsylvania.  It hosted races from 1903 to 1914, including a race in 1905 AAA Championship Car season won by Louis Chevrolet.  It is now the site of a fossil-fuel power plant.

References

External links
 Brunot Island Race Track

1903 establishments in Pennsylvania
1914 disestablishments in Pennsylvania
Motorsport venues in Pennsylvania
Defunct motorsport venues in the United States
History of Pittsburgh